Oscar Fay Adams (1855–1919) was a United States editor and author.

Biography
He was born in Worcester, Massachusetts, where he was educated in secondary schools, and graduated from the New Jersey State Normal School. He taught classes in English literature, and after 1880 wrote for periodicals.

He died in North Truro, Massachusetts on April 30, 1919.

Works
Adams wrote The Story of Jane Austen's Life (1891; second edition, 1896), The Archbishop's Unguarded Moment, and Other Stories (1899) and Dictionary of American Authors (revised edition, 1901). He edited Through the Year With the Poets (12 volumes, 1886).

References

 
Attribution

External links
 
 
 

1855 births
1919 deaths
American editors
Writers from Worcester, Massachusetts
The College of New Jersey alumni
19th-century American biographers
American male biographers
19th-century American short story writers